David Guest (born 22 August 1981 in Burnie, Tasmania) is a field hockey midfielder from Australia.

External links
 
 Profile on Hockey Australia

1981 births
Australian male field hockey players
People from Burnie, Tasmania
Living people
Olympic field hockey players of Australia
Olympic bronze medalists for Australia
Field hockey players at the 2008 Summer Olympics
Olympic medalists in field hockey
Medalists at the 2008 Summer Olympics
Sportsmen from Tasmania